Lancia Esadelta is an Italian truck produced from 1959 to 1971.

History
The predecessor was the Lancia Esatau truck and the successor the Fiat 684.
This truck had many versions used in European countries especially in Italy.

Technical characteristics
The maximum speed of the truck is 67 km/h. The transmission is 4x2 - 6x2/2 and had a 6-cylinder diesel engine.

Versions
Lancia Esadelta A
Lancia Esadelta B
Lancia Esadelta C

Esadelta